Shrikhand is a traditional sweet of the Indian subcontinent made from strained yogurt. It is often served as part of a thali (platter) or with puris (puffed deep-fried whole wheat bread). It is a traditional dessert in Gujarati and Marathi cuisine.

History
Both Gujaratis and Maharashtrians claim the invention of shrikhand. According to a popular legend, shrikhand was invented by traveling herders. To carry their yogurt more easily while traveling overnight, they strained out its whey. Since the strained yogurt became sour by morning, they mixed it with sugar and nuts to make it more palatable, and shrikhand was born.

According to food historian K. T. Achaya, shrikhand was first made around 500 BC. His book Indian Food: A Historical Companion states, "To dewater curd, it was hung in a muslin bag for a few hours; sugar and spices added to the mass yielded shikharini (identical with modern day shrikhand), first noted around 500 BC.” As seen below, this procedure is still followed today.

The 11th century Kannada poet Chavundaraya II gave a recipe for shrikhand (as shikharini) in his book on agriculture, the Lokopakara.  The Soopa Shastra, a cookbook written in 1508 by the Jain king Mangarasa III, also mentions shrikhand.

Preparation
To prepare shrikhand, yogurt is poured onto a cheesecloth. The cheesecloth is tied and hung for several hours to drain the whey. The strained yogurt is transferred to a bowl, and sugar, saffron, and cardamom are added. The mixture is whisked thoroughly to blend the flavors and impart a smooth, creamy texture. It is then covered, chilled for a few hours, and served. The prepared shrikhand may be garnished with almonds or pistachios before serving.

Gallery

See also
 List of yogurt-based dishes and beverages

References

Bibliography

External links

Maharashtrian cuisine
Indian desserts
Yogurt-based dishes
Indian dairy products